This Night is the fifth studio album  by Destroyer, released on October 2, 2002. It was their first on Merge Records. Most of the material was written in Madrid, where Dan Bejar went to sidestep a tour with The New Pornographers, following the critical success of that supergroups's first album.

The song, "Hey, Snow White" was covered by The New Pornographers, whose version appears on Dark Was the Night.

Track listing

Personnel 
Dan Bejar
Nicholas Bragg
Chris Frey
Fisher Rose

References

2002 albums
Destroyer (band) albums
Albums produced by John Collins (Canadian musician)
Albums produced by David Carswell